is a 1924 black and white Japanese silent film with benshi accompaniment directed by Buntaro Futagawa. Often acclaimed as the predecessor to Orochi, it tells the tale of a nihilistic samurai,  played by Tsumasaburo Bando whose mother is killed, whose sister is used and deceived and who loses the only love of his life.

References

External links
Gyakuryu on Internet Movie Database

1924 films
Japanese silent films
Japanese black-and-white films